Martin Schlichenmaier is a German - Luxembourgish mathematician whose research  deals with algebraic, geometric and analytic mathematical methods which partly have relations to theoretical and mathematical  physics.

Life and work 
In 1990 Schlichenmaier  earned a doctoral degree.  in mathematics at the  University of Mannheim with  Rainer Weissauer  with the thesis  Verallgemeinerte Krichever - Novikov Algebren und  deren Darstellungen. His research topics are,  beside other fields , the geometric foundations of   quantisation,  e.g. Berezin-Toeplitz-Quantisierung 
and infinite dimensional   Lie algebras of geometric origin, like the algebras of Krichever- Novikov type.

From  1986 until  2003 he worked at the University of Mannheim. In the year 1996  he habilitated with the thesis  Zwei Anwendungen algebraisch-geometrischer Methoden in der theoretischen Physik: Berezin-Toeplitz-Quantisierung und globale Algebren der zweidimensionalen konformen Feldtheorie 

Since  2003 he has been  professor at the  University of Luxemburg, recently  as  Emeritus . From  2005 until  2017 he was director of the Mathematical Research Unit, Department of Mathematics
 at the  University of  Luxemburg. He is a member of the editorial boards of the mathematical journals  Journal of Lie Theory, and Analysis and Mathematical Physics

He is president of the   Luxembourgish Mathematical Society, SML. He received the  Grand Prix 2016 en sciences mathematiques  de L'Institut Grand-Ducal
-prix de la Bourse de Luxembourg.  2019 he was appointed as full member of the  Institut Grand-Ducal, Section des Sciences

Selected publications 
Books:
.

.

Articles:

.

.
 
.

References

External links 
 Martin Schlichenmaiers  Homepage at the  Universität Luxemburg
 Autoren-Profil Martin Schlichenmaier in the database  zbMATH
 

1952 births
Academic staff of the University of Mannheim
Academic staff of the University of Luxembourg
20th-century German mathematicians
21st-century German mathematicians
Living people